The Asolo Repertory Theatre is located in  Sarasota, Florida. It was originally a summers-only operation called The Asolo Comedy Festival. In 1963 it began to be referred to as The Asolo Theatre Festival. Starting in the fall of 1966, when it went into year-round operation, the name was changed to The Asolo Theater Company (and it continued under that name for the next 30 years, when its title reverted to The Asolo Theater Festival). Starting in 2006, it became The Asolo Repertory Theater, familiarly known as The Asolo Rep.

1960

Asolo Comedy Festival Productions
The Ridiculous Ladies (Les Précieuses Ridicules) by Molière
The Doubles (I Due Simili), commedia dell'arte scenario 
The Rivals by Richard Brinsley Sheridan
The Servant of Two Masters by Carlo Goldoni
The Beggar's Opera by John Gay
The Man of Mode by George Etherege

1961

Asolo Comedy Festival Productions
The Country Wife by William Wycherley
The World in the Moon
Commedia Dell'Arte
She Stoops to Conquer by Oliver Goldsmith
Tartuffe by Molière
The Secret Marriage

1962

Asolo Comedy Festival Productions
The Way of the World by William Congreve
Commedia Dell'Arte
The Barber of Seville
The Misanthrope by Molière
La Serva Padrona by Giovanni Battista Pergolesi
The Music Master

1963

Asolo Theatre Festival Productions
The Taming of the Shrew by William Shakespeare
The Mistress of the Inn by Carlo Goldoni
The Rivals by Richard Brinsley Sheridan
The School for Wives by Molière
Cyrano De Bergerac by Edmond Rostand

1964

Asolo Theatre Festival Productions
Twelfth Night or What You Will by William Shakespeare
The Imaginary Invalid by Molière
The Lady's Not For Burning by Christopher Fry
The School for Scandal by Richard Brinsley Sheridan

1965

Asolo Theatre Festival Productions
Hamlet by William Shakespeare
The Importance of Being Earnest by Oscar Wilde
Volpone by Ben Jonson
Tiger at the Gates by Jean Giraudoux; translated into English by Christopher Fry

1966

Asolo Theatre Festival Productions
Much Ado About Nothing by William Shakespeare
The Miser by Molière
A Man For All Seasons by Robert Bolt
Oedipus the King by Sophocles
The Bald Soprano by Eugène Ionesco

1966-1967

Asolo Theater Company Productions
As You Like It by William Shakespeare
Major Barbara by George Bernard Shaw
The Fan
The Cherry Orchard by Anton Chekhov
The Madwoman of Challiot
The Farce of Scalin
Eleonora Duse
Romeo and Juliet by William Shakespeare

Asolo Theater Company Tours
As You Like It by William Shakespeare
Major Barbara by George Bernard Shaw

1967–1968

Asolo Theater Company Productions
Henry the Fourth, Part One by William Shakespeare
The Servant of Two Masters by Carlo Goldoni
Tartuffe by Molière
J.B. by Archibald MacLeish
Look Back in Anger by John Osborne
Antigone by Jean Anouilh
A Midsummer Night's Dream by William Shakespeare
The Alchemist by Fred Gaines based on Ben Jonson's play
The Visit by Friedrich Dürrenmatt
Wilde! by Fred Gaines
The Caretaker by Harold Pinter

1966-1967

Asolo Theater Company ProductionsAsolo Theater Company Tours
Henry the Fourth, Part One by William Shakespeare
The Servant of Two Masters by Carlo Goldoni
Asolo Theater Company Productions
Arms and the Man by George Bernard Shaw
The Misanthrope by Molière
Oh! What a Lovely War by Joan Littlewood
The Lion in Winter by James Goldman
The Homecoming by Harold Pinter
Two Gentlemen of Verona by William Shakespeare
You Can't Take It With You by George S. Kaufman and Moss Hart
The Lark by Jean Anouilh
The Hostage by Brendan Behan
Uncle Vanya by Anton Chekhov
The Silver Thread

Asolo Rep Tours
Arms and the Man by George Bernard Shaw
The Misanthrope by Molière

1969–1970

Asolo Rep Productions
Blithe Spirit by Noël Coward
The Glass Menagerie by Tennessee Williams
Misalliance by George Bernard Shaw
The Physicists by Friedrich Dürrenmatt
Oh Dad, Poor Dad, Mamma's Hung You in the Closet and I'm Feelin' So Sad by Arthur Kopit
Doctor Faustus by Christopher Marlowe
A Flea in Her Ear by Georges Feydeau
Life with Father by Lindsay and Crouse, based on the book by Clarence Day
All's Well That Ends Well by William Shakespeare
The Prince
The Tortoise and the Hare

Asolo Rep Tours
The Glass Menagerie by Tennessee Williams

1970–1971

Asolo Rep Productions
Born Yesterday by Garson Kanin
Candida by George Bernard Shaw
A Day in the Death of Joe Egg by Peter Nichols
The Comedy of Errors by William Shakespeare
Love for Love
The Subject Was Roses by Frank D. Gilroy
Charley's Aunt by Brandon Thomas
Our Town by Thornton Wilder
Indians by Arthur Kopit
The Puppet Prince
The Snow Queen

Asolo Rep Tours
Candida by George Bernard Shaw
Androcles and the Lion by George Bernard Shaw
Hansel and Gretel

1971–1972

Asolo Rep Productions
The Front Page by Ben Hecht and Charles MacArthur
Twelfth Night or What You Will by William Shakespeare
The Best Man by Gore Vidal
Hay Fever by Noël Coward
Dracula by Hamilton Deane
The House of Blue Leaves by John Guare
The Matchmaker by Thornton Wilder
The Devil's Disciple by George Bernard Shaw
War and Peace by Eb Thomas
The Time of Your Life by William Saroyan
The Legend of Sleepy Hollow
The King Stag by Carlo Gozzi, translated by Eb Thomas

Asolo Rep Tours
Twelfth Night or What You Will by William Shakespeare
Cinderella
Just So Stories by Rudyard Kipling

1972–1973

Asolo Rep Productions
Pygmalion by George Bernard Shaw
Angel Street by Patrick Hamilton
The Philadelphia Story by Philip Barry
The Crucible by Arthur Miller
Hotel Paradiso by Georges Feydeau and Maurice Desavallieres
The Effect of Gamma Rays on Man-in-the-Moon Marigolds by Paul Zindel
Little Mary Sunshine by Rick Besoyan
The Rose Tattoo by Tennessee Williams
The Merchant of Venice by William Shakespeare
Big Klaus and Little Klaus
Aladdin
The Canterville Ghost adapted from the story by Oscar Wilde
The Wind in the Willows

Asolo Rep Tours
Angel Street by Patrick Hamilton
Jack and the Beanstalk
Two Pails of Water
Aladdin

1973–1974

Asolo Rep Productions
Trelawny of the Wells by Arthur Wing Pinero
Private Lives by Noël Coward
The Devil's General
Broadway by George Abbott and Philip Dunning
A Delicate Balance by Edward Albee
Arsenic and Old Lace by Joseph Kesselring
Inherit the Wind by Jerome Lawrence and Robert Edwin Lee
Ring Round the Moon by Christopher Fry
The Tragedy of Macbeth by William Shakespeare
Don Quixote of La Mancha
Story Theatre

Asolo Rep Tours
Private Lives by Noël Coward
The Brave Little Tailor
Reynard the Fox

1974–1975

Asolo Rep Productions
There's One in Every Marriage by Georges Feydeau
The Mistress of the Inn by Carlo Goldoni
The Plough and the Stars by Seán O'Casey
Tobacco Road by Jack Kirkland
Heartbreak House by George Bernard Shaw
The Sea by Edward Bond
Guys and Dolls -music and lyrics by Frank Loesser; book by Jo Swerling and Abe Burrows
Tartuffe by Molière
King Lear by William Shakespeare
The Patriots by Sidney Kingsley
Trolls and Bridges

Asolo Rep Tours
The Mistress of the Inn by Carlo Goldoni
Rumpelstiltskin
Heracles

1975–1976

Asolo Rep Productions
The New York Idea by Langdon Elwyn Mitchell
Hogan's Goat by William Alfred
Going Ape
Boy Meets Girl  by Samuel and Bella Spewack
A Streetcar Named Desire by Tennessee Williams
The Quibbletown Recruits
The Music Man by Meredith Willson
Look Homeward, Angel by Ketti Frings
Win With Wheeler
1776 – music and lyrics by Sherman Edwards; book by Peter Stone
And All That Jazz

Second stage
Knock Knock by Jules Feiffer
The Sea Horse
Oh, Coward!
Serenading Louie by Lanford Wilson
Two for the Seesaw by William Gibson

Asolo Rep Tours
The Patriots by Sidney Kingsley
Hansel and Gretel
Peck's Bad Boy
Something with Jamie in the Title
Antigone by Sophocles

1976–1977

Asolo Rep Productions
The Ruling Class by Peter Barnes
Mummer's End
Cat on a Hot Tin Roof by Tennessee Williams
The Waltz of the Toreadors by Jean Anouilh
Desire Under the Elms by Eugene O'Neill
My Love to Your Wife
Cyrano de Bergerac by Edmond Rostand
Saturday, Sunday, Monday
Cromwell by Victor Hugo

Second stage
Scapino!
A Christmas Carol
The Importance of Being Earnest by Oscar Wilde
The Good Doctor by Neil Simon

Asolo Rep Tours
Queen Bird and the Golden Fish
Step on a Crack
Hey There – Hello
The Doctor in Spite of Himself by Molière

1977–1978

Asolo Rep Productions
The Royal Family by George S. Kaufman and Edna Ferber
Juno and the Paycock by Seán O'Casey
She Stoops to Conquer by Oliver Goldsmith
The School for Wives by Molière
Travesties by Tom Stoppard
Richard III by William Shakespeare
The Man Who Came to Dinner by George S. Kaufman and Moss Hart
The Inspector General by Nikolai Gogol
Catsplay

Asolo Rep Tours
Vasilia
The Bald Soprano by Eugène Ionesco
Wiley and the Hairy Man by Jack Stokes

FSU/Asolo Conservatory Productions
Archy and Friends
In this Golden Land
Whatever Became of Love
Aria Da Capia

1978–1979

Asolo Rep Productions
Design for Living by Noël Coward
The Shadow Box by Michael Cristofer
Volpone by Ben Jonson
Let's Get a Divorce
Long Day's Journey into Night by Eugene O'Neill
A History of American Film
Othello by William Shakespeare
Stag at Bay
The Cherry Orchard by Anton Chekhov

Asolo Rep Tours
Plain Folk
Press Cuttings
Raduz and the Three Clouds

FSU/Asolo Conservatory Productions
Merlin!
Good Doctor by Neil Simon

1979–1980

Asolo Rep Productions
Ah, Wilderness! by Eugene O'Neill
The Tempest by William Shakespeare
Da by Hugh Leonard
Tintypes conceived by Mary Kyte with Mel Marvin and Gary Pearle
Man and Superman by George Bernard Shaw
Idiot's Delight by Robert E. Sherwood
The Warrens of Virginia
Transcendental Love
Stand-Off At Beaver and Pine

Asolo Rep Tours
Beauty and the Beast
The Tingalary Bird
The Tragedy of Macbeth by William Shakespeare
The Marriage Proposal by Anton Chekhov

1980–1981

Asolo Rep Productions
On Golden Pond by Ernest Thompson
The Beggar's Opera by John Gay
Terra Nova
The Song is Kern
The Three Musketeers
Picnic by William Inge
Once in a Lifetime by Moss Hart and George S. Kaufman

Asolo Rep Tours
Aladdin
Rashomon
The Men's Cottage

1981–1982

Asolo Rep Productions
A Midsummer Night's Dream by William Shakespeare
Mrs. Warren's Profession by George Bernard Shaw
The Show-Off
The All Night Strut
Charley's Aunt by Brandon Thomas
The Male Animal  by James Thurber and Elliott Nugent
The Girl of the Golden West by David Belasco

Asolo Rep Tours
The Song is Kern
Pinocchio
The Ice Wolf
Comedies of Courtship

1982–1983

Asolo Rep Productions
The Dining Room by A. R. Gurney
A View from the Bridge by Arthur Miller
Misalliance by George Bernard Shaw
Man with a Load of Mischief by Ashley Dukes
Sherlock Holmes
The Winslow Boy by Terence Rattigan
Dark of the Moon by Howard Richardson

Asolo Rep Tours
Angel Street by Patrick Hamilton
Peter and the Hungry Wolf
Hercules and Friends
Canterbury Tales

1983–1984

Asolo Rep Productions
Arms and the Man by George Bernard Shaw
Waiting for Godot by Samuel Beckett
The Gin Game by D.L. Coburn
Promenade, All!
Death of a Salesman by Arthur Miller
The Drunkard by William H. Smith
Rashomon
The Importance of Being Earnest by Oscar Wilde

Asolo Rep Tours
Promenade, All!
The Nightingale
Step on a Crack
Prince Hamlet

FSU/Asolo Conservatory Productions
Hooters
The Lady From Dubuque by Edward Albee
1984 One-Person Shows

1984–1985

Asolo Rep Productions
Children of a Lesser God by Mark Medoff
Amadeus by Peter Shaffer
And a Nightingale Sang by C.P. Taylor
The Little Foxes by Lillian Hellman
Dames at Sea – book and lyrics by George Haimsohn and Robin Miller; music by Jim Wise.
A Month in the Country by Ivan Turgenev
You Can't Take It with You  by George S. Kaufman and Moss Hart
Twice Around the Park by Murray Schisgal

Asolo Rep Tours
Children of a Lesser God by Mark Medoff
Androcles and the Lion
Wiley and the Hairy Man by Jack Stokes
The Doctor in Spite of Himself by Molière

FSU/Asolo Conservatory Productions
Men Without Dates
Chocolate Cake
Final Placement
FM

1985–1986

Asolo Rep Productions
A Christmas Carol: Scrooge and Marley
Greater Tuna by Jaston Williams, Joe Sears, and Ed Howard
A Moon for the Misbegotten by Eugene O'Neill
Sleuth by Anthony Shaffer
Hamlet by William Shakespeare
As Is by William M. Hoffman
Forgive Me, Evelyn Bunns
Tartuffe by Molière
How the Other Half Lives
The Foreigner by Larry Shue

Second stage
A Life in the Theatre by David Mamet
Orphans by Lyle Kessler
Spoon River Anthology by Edgar Lee Masters

Asolo Rep Tours
A Moon for the Misbegotten by Eugene O'Neill
The Frog Prince
Mother Hicks by Suzan Zeder
Antigone by Sophocles

FSU/Asolo Conservatory Productions
Southern Exposures
Laundry and Bourbon by James McLure
Lone Star by James McLure
Loose Ends by Michael Weller
The Real Inspector Hound by Tom Stoppard

1986–1987

Asolo Rep Productions
A Christmas Carol: Scrooge and Marley
The Rainmaker by N. Richard Nash
Who's Afraid of Virginia Woolf? by Edward Albee
Orphans by Lyle Kessler
Deathtrap by Ira Levin
Nunsense by Dan Goggin
Our Town by Thornton Wilder
The Perfect Party
All My Sons by Arthur Miller

Asolo Rep Tours
The Brave Little Tailor
Reynard the Fox
The New Kid
Soldiering

FSU/Asolo Conservatory Productions
Cloud Nine by Caryl Churchill
Taken in Marriage
American Buffalo by David Mamet

1987–1988

Asolo Rep Productions
Nunsense by Dan Goggin
Philadelphia Here I Come! by Brian Friel
The Heiress by Ruth Goetz and Augustus Goetz
Of Mice and Men
Ladies in Retirement by Reginald Denham and Edward Percy
Pump Boys and Dinettes by John Foley, Mark Hardwick, Debra Monk, Cass Morgan, John Schimmel and Jim Wann
I'm Not Rappaport by Herb Gardner
Berlin to Broadway with Kurt Weill

Second stage
First Time Anywhere!
Mass Appeal by Bill C. Davis
Why Can't You Be Him?

Asolo Rep Tours
Mass Appeal by Bill C. Davis
Rumplestiltskin
The Arkansaw Bear
In a Room Somewhere
Candide

FSU/Asolo Conservatory Productions
Early Girl
Biloxi Blues by Neil Simon
The Very Best Time of the Year
As You Like It by William Shakespeare
When You Comin' Back, Red Ryder? by Mark Medoff
Extremities by William Mastrosimone
Starting Here, Starting Now –  lyrics by Richard Maltby, Jr.; music by David Shire
Cappriccio Cabaret
Danny and the Deep Blue Sea by John Patrick Shanley

Conservatory Shorts
Buddies
Ghost Stories
Lone Star by James McLure

1988–1989

Asolo Rep Productions
Side by Side by Sondheim
Towards Zero by Agatha Christie
The Boys Next Door by Tom Griffin
As You Like It by William Shakespeare
Burn This by Lanford Wilson
Medea by Euripides
Frankie and Johnny in the Clair de Lune by Terrence McNally
Eleemosynary by Lee Blessing
Cyrano de Bergerac by Edmond Rostand

Second stage
Driving Around the House
Quarry

Asolo Rep Tours
Towards Zero by Agatha Christie
The Reluctant Dragon
Puss 'n Boots
The Code Breaker
Social Life

FSU/Asolo Conservatory Productions
Christmas on Mars
Hedda Gabler by Henrik Ibsen
Something Blue
Antigone by Sophocles
Love's Labour's Lost by William Shakespeare

1989–1990

Asolo Rep in the Mertz Theatre
A Walk in the Woods by Lee Blessing
Blithe Spirit by Noël Coward
Man and Superman by George Bernard Shaw
Eastern Standard by Richard Greenberg
70, Girls, 70 – book by Fred Ebb and Norman L. Martin; adapted by Joe Masteroff; lyrics by Fred Ebb, and music by John Kander
Talking Pictures
Steel Magnolias by Robert Harling
Quarry
The Mystery of Irma Vep by Charles Ludlam

Asolo Rep Tours
Blithe Spirit by Noël Coward
The Jungle Book
This is Not a Pipe Dream
Troubled Waters
The Code Breaker

FSU/Asolo Conservatory in the Cook Theatre
Crown Cork Cafeteria
The Dining Room by A. R. Gurney

1990–1991

Asolo Rep in the Mertz Theatre
Other People's Money by Jerry Sterner
The Cocktail Hour by A. R. Gurney
Driving Miss Daisy by Alfred Uhry
A Tale of Two Cities
Only Kidding
The Heidi Chronicles by Wendy Wasserstein
"Master Harold"...and the Boys by Athol Fugard
Bedroom Farce by Alan Ayckbourn

FSU/Asolo Conservatory in the Cook Theatre
Bus Stop by William Inge
Sam Shepard: An American Dreamer by Sam Shepard
Molière: Two Plays by Molière

1991–1992

Asolo Rep in the Mertz Theatre
My Three Angels by Samuel and Bella Spewack
The Man of Mode by George Etherege
Odd Jobs
Fences by August Wilson
Songs of Don Juan
Svengali – book and lyrics by Gregory Boyd; music by Frank Wildhorn
Lost Electra
Remembrance by Derek Walcott

FSU/Asolo Conservatory in the Cook Theatre
La Ronde by Arthur Schnitzler
Twelfth Night or What You Will by William Shakespeare
Born Yesterday by Garson Kanin
The Dumb Waiter by Harold Pinter
The Zoo Story by Edward Albee

1992–1993

Asolo Rep in the Mertz Theatre
Real Women Have Curves by Josefina Lopez
The Substance of Fire by Jon Robin Baitz
Centerburg Tales
Sweet and Hot
Nora
Lips Together, Teeth Apart by Terrence McNally
Legacies
Love Letters by A. R. Gurney

FSU/Asolo Conservatory in the Cook Theatre
The Homecoming by Harold Pinter
Terra Nova
Hot' l Baltimore by Lanford Wilson

1993–1994

Asolo Rep in the Mertz Theatre
King Lear by William Shakespeare
Big Top
From the Mississippi Delta
Okiboji
Das Barbecü by Jim Luigs and Scott Warrender
Forty-Four Sycamore by Bernard Farrell
Dancing at Lughnasa by Brian Friel

FSU/Asolo Conservatory in the Cook Theatre
Our Country's Good by Timberlake Wertenbaker
The Woolgatherer by William Mastrosimone
Misalliance by George Bernard Shaw
Tartuffe by Molière
The Crucible by Arthur Miller

1994–1995

Asolo Rep in the Mertz Theatre
The 1940's Radio Hour by Walton Jones
Talley's Folly by Lanford Wilson
Arms and the Man by George Bernard Shaw
The Glass Menagerie by Tennessee Williams
The Gravity of Honey
Bee Hive
13 Rue De L'Amour

FSU/Asolo Conservatory in the Cook Theatre
Hay Fever by Noël Coward
Extremities by William Mastrosimone
The Gift of the Magi
The Winter's Tale by William Shakespeare
Brighton Beach Memoirs by Neil Simon
Broadway Bound by Neil Simon
Dutchman by Amiri Baraka
Action by Sam Shepard
Brilliant Traces by Cindy Lou Johnson

1995–1996

Asolo Rep in the Mertz Theatre
Jane Eyre
The Three Musketeers
A Stone Carver
Noises Off by Michael Frayn
Look Homeward, Angel by Ketti Frings
The Taming of the Shrew by William Shakespeare
Lady Day at Emerson's Bar and Grill
Swingtime Canteen

FSU/Asolo Conservatory in the Cook Theatre
From Belle to Broadway
Working –  book by Stephen Schwartz and Nina Faso; music by Schwartz, Craig Carnelia, Micki Grant, Mary Rodgers, and James Taylor; lyrics by Schwartz, Carnelia, Grant, Taylor, and Susan Birkenhead
Gut Girls
Bother!
Quilters – book by Molly Newman and Barbara Damashek; lyrics and music by Barbara Damashek
American Buffalo by David Mamet
The Cherry Orchard by Anton Chekhov

1996–1997

Asolo Rep in the Mertz Theatre
The Life and Adventures of Nicholas Nickleby, Parts I and II adapted from the Charles Dickens novel by David Edgar
The Immigrant by Mark Harelik
Over My Dead Body by Michael Sutton and Anthony Fingleton
Much Ado About Nothing by William Shakespeare
Room Service by Allen Boretz and John Murray
Beast on the Moon

FSU/Asolo Conservatory in the Cook Theatre
Summer and Smoke by Tennessee Williams
Arcadia by Tom Stoppard
Translations by Brian Friel
Steppin' Out by Richard Harris

Asolo Extras
Once Upon a Midnight
Laundry and Bourbon by James McLure
Talking Head
Saltwater Moon
Art Is Easy!, Money Is Tough

Series X
Words, Words, Words by David Ives
Sure Thing by David Ives
A Lie of the Mind by Sam Shepard

1997–1998

Asolo Rep in the Mertz Theatre
There's One in Every Marriage by Georges Feydeau
Julius Caesar by William Shakespeare
The Sisters Rosensweig by Wendy Wasserstein
The Royal Family by George S. Kaufman and Edna Ferber
Hobson's Choice by Harold Brighouse
Black Coffee by Agatha Christie

FSU/Asolo Conservatory in the Cook Theatre
Whose Life Is It Anyway? by Brian Clark
Crimes of the Heart by Beth Henley
The Two Gentlemen of Verona by William Shakespeare
Noël and Cole: Men About Town

Series X
Mistake in Identities
The Love Talker by Deborah Pryor
 Beirut by Alan Bowne

Late Nite Series
Tall Tales
The Dumb Waiter by Harold Pinter
The Briefing
Everyman

1998–1999

Asolo Rep in the Mertz Theatre
Oh! What a Lovely War by Joan Littlewood
The Last Night of Ballyhoo by Alfred Uhry
Golden Boy by Clifford Odets
Abe Lincoln in Illinois by Robert E. Sherwood
The Ladies of the Camellias by Lillian Garrett-Groag
The Rivals by Richard Brinsley Sheridan

Asolo Rep in the Cook Theatre
Mr. Bundy
All I Really Need to Know I Learned in Kindergarten

FSU/Asolo Conservatory in the Cook Theatre
Shaw, Shaw and More Shaw
Picasso at the Lapin Agile by Steve Martin
Kindertransport by Diane Samuels
The Matchmaker by Thornton Wilder

1999–2000

Asolo Rep in the Mertz Theatre
The Merry Wives of Windsor by William Shakespeare
The Kentucky Cycle, Parts I & II by Robert Schenkkan
Visiting Mr. Green by Jeff Baron
The Count of Monte Cristo
Communicating Doors by Alan Ayckbourn
Broadway by George Abbott and Philip Dunning

Asolo Rep in the Cook Theatre
Three Days of Rain by Richard Greenberg
Collected Stories by Donald Margulies

FSU/Asolo Conservatory in the Cook Theatre
Triumph of Love – book by James Magruder; lyrics by Susan Birkenhead; music by Jeffrey Stock
Bullshot Crummond
The Monogamist by Christopher Kyle
The Turn of the Screw
A View from the Bridge by Arthur Miller

2000–2001

Asolo Rep in the Mertz Theatre
A Christmas Carol
I Hate Hamlet by Paul Rudnick
Morning Star
Cat on a Hot Tin Roof by Tennessee Williams
The Voysey Inheritance by Harley Granville-Barker
Over the Tavern
Sockdology by Jeffrey Hatcher

Asolo Rep in the Cook Theatre
My Way
Art by Yasmina Reza, translated by Christopher Hampton

FSU/Asolo Conservatory in the Cook Theatre
Rumors by Neil Simon
The Physicists by Friedrich Dürrenmatt
Stop Kiss by Diana Son
The Memory of Water by Shelagh Stephenson

2001–2002

Asolo Rep in the Mertz Theatre
A Christmas Carol
A Flea in Her Ear by Georges Feydeau
Da by Hugh Leonard
Born Yesterday by Garson Kanin
The Hollow by Agatha Christie
Twelfth Night by William Shakespeare
The Tale of the Allergist's Wife by Charles Busch

Asolo Rep in the Cook Theatre
SantaLand Diaries by David Sedaris, adapted by Joe Mantello
Fully Committed by Becky Mode and Mark Setlock

FSU/Asolo Conservatory in the Cook Theatre
The Years
Fuddy Meers by David Lindsay-Abaire
The Weir by Conor McPherson
The Way of the World by William Congreve

2002–2003

Asolo Rep in the Mertz Theatre
Inherit the Wind by Jerome Lawrence and Robert Edwin Lee
You Never Can Tell by George Bernard Shaw
Brighton Beach Memoirs by Neil Simon
A Christmas Carol
The Corn is Green by Emlyn Williams
Filumena by Eduardo De Filippo
The Philadelphia Story by Philip Barry

Asolo Rep in the Cook Theatre
Eye of the Storm
Frank Lloyd Wright
Syncopation

FSU/Asolo Conservatory in the Cook Theatre
The Blue Room by David Hare
The Conservationist
The Imaginary Invalid by Molière
The Heiress by Ruth Goetz and Augustus Goetz

2003–2004

Asolo Rep in the Mertz Theatre
The Crucible by Arthur Miller
The Road to Ruin
The Millionairess by George Bernard Shaw
Murder by Misadventure by Edward Taylor
I'm Not Rappaport by Herb Gardner
The Diary of Anne Frank by Frances Goodrich and Albert Hackett
Hay Fever by Noël Coward

Asolo Rep in the Cook Theatre
Noël Coward at the Café de Paris
Free and Clear

FSU/Asolo Conservatory in the Cook Theatre
The Competition
The Shape of Things by Neil LaBute
The Taming of the Shrew by William Shakespeare
Arms and the Man by George Bernard Shaw

Late Night Series
Hits, Bits & Skits
Huma's Loom
Idiot Servant
 No Exit by Jean-Paul Sartre
 The London Project
Redemption
Breaks
Penis Play
Emu Farm
Music for Friends
A Charlie Brown Christmas
The Marriage Proposal by Anton Chekhov
My Prodigal Son

2004–2005

Asolo Rep in the Mertz Theatre
Peter Pan
Sherlock Holmes & the West End Horror
Broadway Bound by Neil Simon
The Smell of the Kill by Michele Lowe
The Front Page by Ben Hecht and Charles MacArthur
A Midsummer Night's Dream by William Shakespeare
Menopause The Musical by Jeanie Linders

Asolo Rep in the Cook Theatre
Mitch Albom's Tuesdays with Morrie by Mitch Albom and Jeffrey Hatcher

FSU/Asolo Conservatory in the Cook Theatre
The Two Gentlemen of Verona by William Shakespeare
Boston Marriage by David Mamet
Love's Fire: Seven New Plays Inspired by Seven Shakespearean Sonnets by Wendy Wasserstein, Eric Bogosian, William Finn, John Guare, Marsha Norman, Tony Kushner, Ntozake Shange
The Island of Slaves by Pierre de Marivaux, adapted by Eb Thomas and Barbara Redmond

Late Night Series
The Minotaur
Swing State
 A Benefit Concert with Bill Deasy
The Louisiana Hayride presents: Elvis
A Night of Comedy
The Isle of Dogs
The Gospel of Cyrus According to Cyrus

2005–2006

Asolo Rep in the Mertz Theatre
Laughing Stock
Enchanted April by Elizabeth von Arnim, adapted by Matthew Barber
A Christmas Carol
Trying
Anything to Declare?
To Kill a Mockingbird
Lady Windermere's Fan by Oscar Wilde
Crowns

Asolo Rep in the Cook Theatre
String of Pearls
Rounding Third

FSU/Asolo Conservatory in the Cook Theatre
Mirandolina by Bohuslav Martinů
What the Butler Saw by Joe Orton
Five by Tenn by Tennessee Williams
Pericles by William Shakespeare

2006–2007

Asolo Rep in the Mertz Theatre
Amadeus by Peter Shaffer
Men of Tortuga by Jason Wells
The Plexiglass Slipper
Expecting Isabel by Lisa Loomer
A Few Good Men by Aaron Sorkin
Pride and Prejudice
Ella

Asolo Rep in the Historic Asolo Theater
Nobody Don't Like Yogi

Asolo Rep in the Cook Theatre
Darwin in Malibu by Crispin Whittell

FSU/Asolo Conservatory in the Historic Asolo Theater
The Parisian Woman

FSU/Asolo Conservatory in the Cook Theatre
This is Our Youth by Kenneth Lonergan
The Bacchae by Euripides
Blue Window by Craig Lucas

Late Night Series
American Buffalo by David Mamet

2007–2008

Asolo Rep in the Mertz TheatreA Tale of Two Cities by Jill SantorielloThe Constant Wife by W. Somerset MaughamDoubt: A Parable by John Patrick ShanleyThe Play's the Thing by Ferenc Molnár, adapted by P. G. WodehouseSmash by Jeffrey Hatcher, (an adaptation of George Bernard Shaw's Novel An Unsocial Socialist)Equus by Peter ShafferWorking, A Musical – book by Stephen Schwartz and Nina Faso; music by Schwartz, Craig Carnelia, Micki Grant, Mary Rodgers, James Taylor, Lin-Manuel Miranda; lyrics by Schwartz, Carnelia, Grant, Taylor, Miranda, and Susan BirkenheadMenopause the Musical™ by Jeanie Linders

Asolo Rep in the Historic Asolo TheaterThe Blonde, the Brunette and the Vengeful Redhead by Robert Hewett

Asolo Rep in the Cook TheatreMiseryLadyFSU/Asolo Conservatory in the Historic Asolo TheaterMurder by Poe by Jeffrey Hatcher (an adaptation of five stories by Edgar Allan Poe)

FSU/Asolo Conservatory in the Cook TheatreSpeed-the-Plow by David MametThe Duchess of Malfi by John WebsterThe Underpants by Steve Martin (adapted from a play by Carl Sternheim)

Late Night Series
1st Annual Love Late NightA People's Movement by Marcus D. Johnson

2008–2009

Asolo Rep in the Mertz TheatreBarnum – book by Mark Bramble; lyrics by Michael Stewart; music by Cy ColemanThe Imaginary Invalid by Molière, adapted by Constance CongdonInventing van Gogh by Steven DietzThe Winter's Tale by William ShakespeareMurderers by Jeffrey HatcherThe Devil's Disciple by George Bernard ShawSouvenir by Stephen Temperley

Asolo Rep in the Historic Asolo TheaterThe GiverThis Wonderful LifeVisiting Mr. Green by Jeff Baron

Asolo Rep in the Cook TheatrePerfect Mendacity by Jason Wells

FSU/Asolo Conservatory in the Historic Asolo TheaterThree Postcards by Craig Lucas and Craig Carnelia

FSU/Asolo Conservatory in the Cook TheatreWilder! Wilder! Wilder! by Thornton WilderBlur by Melanie MarnichMiss Julie by August Strindberg

Late Night SeriesAmerican Buffalo by David Mamet
2nd Annual Love Late Night

2009–2010

Asolo Rep in the Mertz Theatre
 Contact created by Susan Stroman and John Weidman; October 24, 2009 – November 29, 2009
 The Perfume Shop adapted by E.P. Dowdall, based on the play Parfumerie by Miklós László; December 4, 2009 – April 1, 2010
 Life of Galileo by Bertolt Brecht; December 11, 2009 – February 23, 2010
 Searching for Eden: The Diaries of Adam and Eve by James Still, based partly on the comic writing of Mark Twain; December 18, 2009 – February 25, 2010
 Hearts by Willy Holtzman; January 22, 2010 – April 11, 2010
 Managing Maxine by Janece Shaffer; March 12, 2010 – April 17, 2010
 Dancing Backwards in High Heels – The Ginger Musical conceived & developed by Lynnette Barkley & Christopher McGovern; May 7, 2010 – May 30, 2010

Asolo Rep in the Historic Asolo Theatre
 New Stages Project: Life in the Middle; October 21, 2009 – November 8, 2009
 The Last Five Years by Jason Robert Brown; January 21, 2010 – February 28, 2010
 Unplugged: Theatre in the Raw – New Play Festival; March 24, 2010 – April 18, 2010

The FSU/Asolo Conservatory for Actor Training
 The Mystery Plays by Roberto Aguirre-Sacasa; October 27, 2009 – November 15, 2009
 Blue/Orange by Joe Penhall; January 5, 2010 – January 24, 2010
 Machinal by Sophie Treadwell; March 2, 2010 – March 21, 2010
 The Game of Love and Chance by Pierre Marivaux; April 14, 2010 – May 3, 2010

Late Night Series
3rd Annual Love Late NightDutchman by Amiri Baraka
Tunes for TwoThe Rachel Corrie Project edited by Kirstin Franklin

2010–2011

Asolo Rep in the Mertz Theatre
 Bonnie & Clyde: A New Musical (Pre-Broadway Run) by Frank Wildhorn (music), Don Black (lyrics), and Ivan Menchell (book), directed by Jeff Calhoun; November 19, 2010 – December 19, 2010
 La Bête by David Hirson, directed by Michael Donald Edwards; January 27, 2011 – February 24, 2011
 Twelve Angry Men by Reginald Rose, directed by Frank Galati; January 14, 2011 – March 31, 2011
 Boeing Boeing by Marc Camoletti, translated by Beverley Cross & Francis Evans, directed by Greg Leaming; January 21, 2011 – April 23, 2011
 Deathtrap by Ira Levin, directed by Peter Amster; March 11, 2011 – May 14, 2011
 Las Meninas (The Waiting Women) by Lynn Nottage, directed by Michael Donald Edwards; March 18, 2011 – May 15, 2011

Asolo Rep Touring Company
 Antigone Now by Melissa Cooper (based on Antigone by Sophocles); preview on October 4, 2010, followed by a performance on October 9, 2010, and then TBA touring dates

Asolo Rep Off-Main
 George Gershwin Alone by Hershey Felder; May 19, 2011 – June 5, 2011
 Beethoven, As I Knew Him by Hershey Felder; June 8, 2011 – June 12, 2011
 Asolo Rep UNPLUGGED 2011 (A new works festival, comprising a world premiere of a new play, and four staged readings of new works); –  April 15, 2011 – May 14, 2011

The FSU/Asolo Conservatory for Actor Training
 The Two Gentlemen of Verona by William Shakespeare, directed by Greg Leaming; October 26, 2010 – November 14, 2010
 reasons to be pretty by Neil LaBute, directed by Barbara Redmond; January 4, 2011 – January 23, 2011
 The Lady from the Sea by Henrik Ibsen, directed by Andrei Malaev-Babel; February 22, 2011 – March 13, 2011
 Tartuffe by Molière, directed by Wes Grantom; April 12, 2011 – May 1, 2011

Late Night SeriesRed Light Winter by Adam RappThe London Monologues by Adam Carpenter, Kim Hausler, Ron Kagan, Will Little, and Angela SauerThe Thrill of the Chase by Philip GawthorneMen of Tortuga by Jason Wells
4th Annual Love Late Night

2016–2017

Asolo Rep in the Mertz Theatre
 Guys and Dolls, based on a story by and characters of Damon Runyon, book by Jo Swerling and Abe Burrows, music and lyrics by Frank Loesser.  Choreographed and directed by Josh Rhodes, November 15, 2016 – January 1, 2017.
 The Great Society, by Robert Schenkkan, based on the original production directed by Bill Rauch.  Directed by Nicole A. Watson, January 11–April 2, 2017.
 The Originalist, by John Strand.  Directed by Molly Smith, January 18–March 7, 2017.
 Born Yesterday, by Garson Kanin.  Directed by Peter Amster, February 8–April 15, 2017.
 The Little Foxes, by Lillian Hellman.  Directed by Frank Galati, March 17-April 15, 2017.
 The Elaborate Entrance of Chad Deity, by Kristoffer Diaz.  Directed by Jen Wineman, April 4–30, 2017 (a special production in the Cook Theatre).
 Beatsville, book by Glenn Slater, music and lyrics by Wendy Leigh Wilf.  Directed by Bill Berry, April 27-May 27, 2017 (world premier, a co-production with Seattle's 5th Avenue Theatre). 
 Twenty Thousand Leagues Under the Sea, by Craig Francis and Rick Miller, based on the book by Jules Verne.  Directed by Rick Miller, June 7-July 1, 2017.

The FSU/Asolo Conservatory for Actor Training in the Cook Theatre
 Book of Days, by Lanford Wilson.  Directed by Greg Leaming, November 1–20, 2016.
 A View From The Bridge, by Arthur Miller.  Directed by Andrei Malaev-Babel, December 27, 2016 – January 15, 2017.
 The Drunken City, by Adam Bock.  Directed by Jesse Jou, February 21–March 12, 2017.
 A Midsummer Night’s Dream, by William Shakespeare.  Directed by Jonathan Epstein, April 11–29, 2017 (presented in collaboration with and at the Marie Selby Botanical Gardens).

Dog Days Theatre
 Relatively Speaking, by Alan Ayckbourn.  Directed by Brendon Fox, July 11–30, 2017.
 Double Indemnity, by James M. Cain.  Directed by Greg Leaming, January 11–April 2, 2017.

2017–2018

Asolo Rep in the Mertz Theatre
 Evita, lyrics by Tim Rice, music by Andrew Lloyd Webber.  Directed and choreographed by Josh Rhodes, November 18–December 30, 2017 (Previews November 15–17). 
 Shakespeare in Love, based on the screenplay by Marc Norman and Tom Stoppard, adapted for the stage by Lee Hall.  Directed by Rachel Rockwell, January 13–March 28, 2018 (Previews January 10–12).  
 The Morning After Grace, by Carey Crim.  Directed by Peter Amster, January 19–March 4, 2018 (Previews January 17–18).  
 Rhinoceros, by Eugene Ionesco, translated by Derek Prouse.  Directed by Frank Galati, February 9-April 14, 2018 (Previews February 7–8).  
 Roe, by Lisa Loomer.  Directed by Lavina Jadhwani, March 16-April 14, 2018 (Previews March 14–15).  
 Ragtime, book by Terrence McNally, music by Stephen Flaherty, lyrics by Lynn Ahren.  Directed by Peter Rothstein, May 4–27, 2018 (Previews May 1–3) (A collaboration with Seattle's 5th Avenue Theatre).

Additional 2017–18 Productions
 Gloria'', by Branden Jacobs-Jenkins.  Directed by Greg Leaming, April 6–29, 2018 (Previews April 4–5), in The Cook Theatre.

Summer Family Production
"Asolo Rep Continues Its Commitment To Present World Class, Family Friendly Productions Each June. To Be Announced Very Soon!"  June 8–30, 2018 (Previews June 6–7).

References

External links
Asolo Repertory Theatre web site

Theatre company production histories